In the mathematical discipline of algebraic geometry, Serre's theorem on affineness (also called Serre's cohomological characterization of affineness or Serre's criterion on affineness) is a theorem due to Jean-Pierre Serre which gives sufficient conditions for a scheme to be affine. The theorem was first published by Serre in 1957.

Statement
Let  be a scheme with structure sheaf  If:
(1)  is quasi-compact, and
(2) for every quasi-coherent ideal sheaf  of -modules,
then  is affine.

Related results
 A special case of this theorem arises when  is an algebraic variety, in which case the conditions of the theorem imply that  is an affine variety.
 A similar result has stricter conditions on  but looser conditions on the cohomology: if  is a quasi-separated, quasi-compact scheme, and if  for any quasi-coherent sheaf of ideals  of finite type, then  is affine.

Notes

References

Bibliography
 
 
 
 
 

Theorems in algebraic geometry